The 2001–02 season is MC Alger's 34th season in the Algerian top flight, They will be competing in National 1, and the Algerian Cup.

Squad list
Players and squad numbers last updated on 1 September 2001.Note: Flags indicate national team as has been defined under FIFA eligibility rules. Players may hold more than one non-FIFA nationality.

Pre-season and friendlies

Competitions

Overview

{| class="wikitable" style="text-align: center"
|-
!rowspan=2|Competition
!colspan=8|Record
!rowspan=2|Started round
!rowspan=2|Final position / round
!rowspan=2|First match	
!rowspan=2|Last match
|-
!
!
!
!
!
!
!
!
|-
| National

|  
| style="background:#FFCCCC;"|15th
| 30 August 2001
| 1 July 2002
|-
| Algerian Cup

| Round of 64
| Quarter-finals
| 14 March 2002
| 24 May 2002
|-
! Total

National

League table

Results summary

Results by round

Matches

Algerian Cup

Squad information

Playing statistics

|-

|-
! colspan=10 style=background:#dcdcdc; text-align:center| Players transferred out during the season

Goalscorers
Includes all competitive matches. The list is sorted alphabetically by surname when total goals are equal.

Transfers

In

Out

Notes

References

MC Alger seasons
MC Alger